Seong Kyung-Il (born 1 March 1983) is a South Korean football player who currently plays as goalkeeper.

External links 
 

1983 births
Living people
Association football defenders
South Korean footballers
Jeonbuk Hyundai Motors players
Gyeongnam FC players
Gimcheon Sangmu FC players
K League 1 players
Association football goalkeepers